Jan Latvala (born June 10, 1972) is a retired Finnish professional ice hockey defenceman who last played for Pelicans of the SM-liiga. Latvala is current record holder of most played regular season games in SM-liiga with a total of 1,230 games. He surpassed Erik Hämäläinen's record on February 18, 2012 playing his 1,002nd game.

Career statistics

References

External links

1972 births
Finnish ice hockey defencemen
Jokerit players
JYP Jyväskylä players
Living people
Lahti Pelicans players
Sportspeople from Jyväskylä